Robert Humphreys (politician) (1893–1977) was a U.S. Senator from Kentucky in 1956, and also served in the Kentucky State Senate. Senator Humphreys may also refer to:

Andrew Humphreys (1821–1904), Indiana State Senate
Benjamin G. Humphreys (1808–1882), Mississippi State Senate
Parry Wayne Humphreys (1778–1839), Tennessee State Senate

See also
Stanley H. Humphries (born 1969), Kentucky State Senate
Senator Humphrey (disambiguation)